was a Japanese daimyō of the Edo period, who ruled the Owari Domain. His childhood name was Yasuchiyo (愷千代).

He had a retreat north of Nagoya Castle called Shin Goten (新御殿 New Palace) in what is today Horibata-chō (堀端町).

Family
 Father: Tokugawa Harukuni (1776–1793), brother of the 11th shōgun Tokugawa Ienari
 Mother: Nijo Yasuko, daughter of Nijo Harutaka
 Wife: Tokugawa Toshihime (1789–1817), daughter of the 11th shōgun Tokugawa Ienari

References 

1793 births
1850 deaths
Lords of Owari